{{Infobox writer
| name         = Lisa Papademetriou
| birth_date    = 
| death_date    = 
| death_place   = 
| occupation   = Novelist
| nationality  = American
| ethnicity    = 
| citizenship  = 
| period       = 2005-present
| genre        = Young Adult Fiction
| notableworks = Sixth Grade Glommers, Norks, and MeThe Wizard, The Witch, and Two Girls from Jersey
| spouse       = Ali Usman
| partner      = 
| children     = 1
| relatives    = 
| influences   = 
| influenced   = 
| awards       = 
| signature    =
| website      = 
| portaldisp   = 
}}

Lisa Papademetriou is an American author of young adult fiction.

Life and career
Papademetriou was born August 25, 1971 and grew up in Houston, Texas, attending West University Elementary School, Lanier Middle School, and Episcopal High School of Houston.  She graduated from Vassar College in 1993.  Her first book, Sixth Grade Glommers, Norks, and Me, was published in 2006  by Hyperion. She has written/adapted over thirty books for children and young adults. Her 2005 book, M or F? : a novel'' is in over 500 libraries according to WorldCat. She also wrote the "Accidentally" series (Accidentally Fabulous, Accidentally Famous, Accidentally Fooled, and Accidentally Friends), How to Be a Girly Girl in Just 10 Days, and Ice Dreams for Scholastic's line of Candy Apple books....

References

External links

 https://web.archive.org/web/20120325173312/http://www.sirensstorm.com/

Living people
1971 births
American children's writers
American women children's writers
21st-century American women